This is a list of museums in Greenland.

Museums in Greenland 
Greenland National Museum
Aasiaat Museum
Ilulissat Art Museum
Nanortalik Museum
Nuuk Art Museum
Qaqortoq Museum
Sisimiut Museum
Upernavik Museum
Ilulissat Kunstmuseum in Ilulissat
Ittoqqortoormiit Museum in Ittoqqortoormiit
Knud Rasmussens Museum in Ilulissat
Maniitsoq Muuseum in Maniitsoq
Narsaq Museum in Narsaq
Narsarsuaq Museum in Narsarsuaq
Paamiiut Museum in Paamiut
Qaanaaq Museum in Qaanaaq
Qasigiannguit Museum in Qasigiannguit
Qeqertarsuaq Museum in Qeqertarsuaq
Uummannaq Museum in Uummannaq

See also 

 List of museums

 
Museums
Greenland
Greenland
+Greenland
Museums